Capital Cascade Greenway is an urban greenway in Tallahassee, Florida, United States designed for managing stormwater, enhancing natural and cultural heritage, and assist in promoting sustainable development.

Location 
The Capital Cascade Greenway is a 6-mile (9.6 km) long greenway through downtown Tallahassee that follows the course of the St. Augustine Branch, a small creek that flows south through Cascades Park, Black Swamp, and ends in Lake Munson. The project corridor includes both public and private land.

History 
The birth of the Capital Cascade Greenway came from Tallahassee's Blueprint 2000, an initiative to provide stormwater, trail and road projects that are efficient, attractive, environmentally responsible, and support the revitalization of in-town and southside neighborhoods. It is funded by an extension of the local one-cent sales tax approved by voters in November 2000. The U.S. Environmental Protection Agency and the Department of Community Affairs have invested $7.8 million to the project. The Trust for Public Land is also a partner in the greenway's creation.

Stormwater 
The greenway  will address stormwater and flooding problems in southern Tallahassee where the St. Augustine Branch basin slopes steeply near downtown. Almost the whole basin is built upon which has increased the amount of impervious surfaces leaving no absorption area for rain.

Recreation 
Capital Cascade Greenway will include trails for walking, and biking and link to the St. Mark's Trail, the Bow Tie Trail and the proposed Gopher, Frog and Alligator Trail (GFA.) The greenway will also have parks and playgrounds, businesses and shops and an opportunity to preserve a historic section of Florida's capital city. Parts of the corridor house the Korean War Memorial as well as historic plaques that commemorate the beginnings of Tallahassee and the State of Florida. The corridor is also very close to a number of structures listed on the National Register of Historic Places as well as historic neighborhoods such as Stearns-Mosely.

Sources 
Capital Cascades Trails
The Trust for Public Land
Florida Department of Environmental Protection

Parks in Tallahassee, Florida
History of Tallahassee, Florida
Protected areas of Leon County, Florida